Iqaluit Centre was a territorial electoral district (riding) for the Legislative Assembly of Nunavut, Canada.

The riding consisted of the community of Iqaluit.

Hunter Tootoo, former federal Minister of Fisheries, Oceans and the Canadian Coast Guard served as the Member of the Legislative Assembly for this riding until its disestablishment in 2013.

Election results

1999 election

2004 election

2008 election

References

External links
Website of the Legislative Assembly of Nunavut

Electoral districts of Qikiqtaaluk Region
1999 establishments in Nunavut
2013 disestablishments in Nunavut